This is the discography of Japanese singer and cellist Kanon Wakeshima.

Albums

Studio albums

EPs

Singles

Digital Single

Kanon x Kanon singles

Best Album

Music videos

Kanon x Kanon music videos

Guest contributions
 Featured on the track "Halloween Party" by Halloween Junky Orchestra (2012)

External links 
 Kanon Wakeshima Discography (Sony Music Japan)

Discographies of Japanese artists